Ribolt is an unincorporated community in Lewis County, in the U.S. state of Kentucky.

History
A post office called Ribolt was established in 1898, and remained in operation until 1936. The community was named for Ribolt Harrison, a town merchant.

References

Unincorporated communities in Lewis County, Kentucky
Unincorporated communities in Kentucky